These are the official results of the Men's 20 km walk event at the 1998 European Championships in Budapest, Hungary. There were a total number of 33 participating athletes, with the race held on 18 August 1998.

Medalists

Abbreviations
All times shown are in hours:minutes:seconds

Records

Final ranking

See also
 1995 Men's World Championships 20km Walk (Gothenburg)
 1996 Men's Olympic 20km Walk (Atlanta)
 1997 Men's World Championships 20km Walk (Athens)
 1998 Race Walking Year Ranking
 1999 Men's World Championships 20km Walk (Seville)
 2000 Men's Olympic 20km Walk (Sydney)
 2001 Men's World Championships 20km Walk (Edmonton)

References
 Results

Walk 20 km
Racewalking at the European Athletics Championships